Homona encausta is a species of moth of the family Tortricidae first described by Edward Meyrick in 1907. It is found in Sri Lanka, Luzon in the Philippines and Vietnam.

The larvae feed on Syzygium jambos and Micromelum minutum.

References

Moths described in 1907
Homona (moth)